Gail June Edwards is a former American former actress. She has appeared as Dot Higgins in ABC's It's a Living, Sharon LeMeure in NBC's Blossom, and Vicky Larson in ABC's Full House.

Early life and education
Edwards was raised in Coral Gables, Florida. Her father hung the curtain and lights while she choreographed, costumed, and starred in her own neighborhood musicals. In the sixth grade, Edwards played Little Mary in The Women at the Coconut Grove Playhouse in Coconut Grove, Florida, where playwright George Abbott came backstage to single out her performance. This appearance became her launching pad for industrial films and local television commercials in South Florida.

Edwards attended the University of Miami, where she graduated in 1975 cum laude.

Career

Edwards wrote, produced, and starred in the off-Broadway musical Becoming. It won the Miami Herald Critics’ Choice award three times before the musical debuted in New York. While in New York, Edwards signed with the LeMond/Zetter Management Group. Soon afterward, she landed the role of Sandy opposite Peter Gallagher in Broadway's East Coast tour of Grease. After producing and starring in two additional productions, The Good One and Vanities, both earning her the Drama-Logue Critics' Award, Edwards turned her focus toward television acting.

Upon moving to Los Angeles in 1976, Edwards signed with the Ro Diamond Agency (later with the Gersh Agency) and immediately began landing guest-star roles on such television series as Happy Days, Lou Grant, M*A*S*H and Taxi.

In 1979, Edwards auditioned for a Witt/Thomas production, in which she landed the role of Dot Higgins on ABC's It’s a Living. The series ran on ABC from 1980 to 1982 and was revived in first-run syndication from 1985 to 1989. Edwards, along with Barrie Youngfellow, Paul Kreppel, and the late Marian Mercer, were the only four members of the It's a Living cast who lasted during the network and syndicated runs. After ABC canceled the show in 1982, Edwards' management was informed by the producers of Happy Days that they were offering her the role of new character K.C. Cunningham, the niece of Howard and Marion Cunningham who was moving in with the family. Without informing Edwards of the offer, her management declined the opportunity, reportedly stating that they did not want Edwards "playing a new character on an old show". Crystal Bernard was then hired for the part. Edwards did not learn of the incident until many years later. In 1985, Edwards and Bernard wound up as co-stars on It's a Living, when the latter resumed production for first-run syndication.

Edwards also appeared in many movies-of-the-week during the 1980s, along with numerous other guest-star appearances in such series as Benson, Buffalo Bill, Doogie Howser, M.D., Knight Rider, Night Court and the premiere episode of Amazing Stories, directed by Steven Spielberg and original music/score by John Williams.

In 1990, Edwards was reunited with former Happy Days producers Thomas L. Miller and Robert L. Boyett, when she was cast as divorced mother Hilary Kozak on their single-season CBS sitcom The Family Man. Upon the series' cancellation in the summer of 1991, Edwards was asked by Miller and Boyett to join the cast of their hit ABC series Full House. They felt Edwards was right for the role of Vicky Larson, a talk show host who strikes up a relationship with Danny Tanner. Edwards made her Full House debut late that year, when the Vicky character first appeared as a substitute host for Rebecca Donaldson, who was on maternity leave, on (the fictional) Wake Up, San Francisco. Vicky and Danny soon embark on a long-term relationship and are engaged in the show's seventh season. Edwards' co-star on The Family Man, Scott Weinger, was transferred over to Full House along with her, playing Steve Hale, the high school boyfriend of D.J. Tanner.

During her tenure on Full House, Edwards also had the recurring guest role of Sharon LeMeure, the fast-talking mother of Six on NBC’s Blossom. Edwards' work on Blossom reunited her with former It's a Living producers Paul Junger Witt and Tony Thomas, who produced both series.

Edwards concluded her roles in Full House (with Vicky Larson having a mutual breakup with Danny Tanner) and Blossom in the spring of 1994. She retired from show business at that time and moved to the Southwest.

In September 2017, it was announced that Edwards would return to acting by reprising her role as Vicky Larson in the third season of the Full House sequel series Fuller House. She appears in the Season 3 finale, "Here Comes the Sun". Edwards then made another appearance in the series finale, "Our Very Last Show, Again".

Retirement
Edwards has supported and participated in several charities, including performing for the Veterans Administration, where she played ukulele that she learned just for this purpose. While in Miami, Edwards had an impromptu visit with Romero Britto who painted her ukulele, for which she thanked him in song via YouTube.

Filmography

TV commercials

Theatre

Awards and honors
2001: Inducted alongside Janet Reno and Al Del Greco in the Coral Gables High School Hall of Fame.

Points of interest
1974: Opened for Frank Sinatra at the Fontainebleau Miami Beach on March 24, benefiting Danny Thomas’ St. Jude Children's Research Hospital
1976: Backup vocalist for Sergio Franchi's U.S. tour
1978: Upon moving to Los Angeles, Edwards lived with former MGM contract star, Gloria DeHaven
Being offered a role without the grueling audition process is the height of tribute in Hollywood. Seven such roles: Anson Williams (A Perfect Little Murder), Steven Spielberg (Amazing Stories), Gary David Goldberg (Family Ties), Don Reo (Blossom), Martha Williamson (Touched by an Angel), Jerry Herman (Mame) and (Fuller House) Jeff Franklin.

See also

List of people from Miami

References

External links

 Gail Edwards “The Fuller House Podcast” Interview Part 1 • Edwards talks: “Happy Days,” “Gary David Goldberg,” Steven Spielberg’s, “Amazing Stories,” “Blossom,” and “Full House."
 Gail Edwards “The Fuller House Podcast” Interview Part 2 • Edwards talks reprising her role as Vicky Larson on “Fuller House.”

Gail Edwards on TVGuide.com
Gail Edwards on TV.com

20th-century American actresses
Actors from Coral Gables, Florida
Actresses from Florida
American film actresses
American stage actresses
American television actresses
Living people
University of Miami alumni
21st-century American women
Year of birth missing (living people)